Sir James Schofield Balderstone AC (2 May 192115 October 2014) was a prominent Australian director of public companies.

Balderstone attended Scotch College, Melbourne. After leaving school he served in the Royal Australian Navy during World War II from 1940 to 1945. He was serving on HMAS Kanimbla in Sydney Harbour on the night that Japanese midget submarines attacked.  After the war he embarked on a career in the rural sector and business.

His directorships and roles included:
Chairman of BHP 1984–89, which included fending off a takeover by Robert Holmes à Court
Chairman of AMP
Chairman of Stanbroke Pastoral Company
Chairman of Chase AMP Bank
Chairman of the Council of Scotch College, Melbourne
Deputy Chairman of Westpac
Director of ICI Australia
Director of Woodside Petroleum

He was knighted in 1983 for services to primary industry and commerce, and was made a Companion of the Order of Australia (AC) in 1992.

He had an identical twin brother, Robert Balderstone CMG MC (1921-2012), a councillor of the Royal Agricultural Society of Victoria for 41 years and president for six, from 1976.

Sir James Balderstone died on 15 October 2014, aged 93. His final 13 years were marred by the effects of a stroke which hampered his speech.

External links
 Jon Condon, "Vale Jim (Sir James) Balderstone". Beef Central

References

1921 births
2014 deaths
Businesspeople from Melbourne
University of Melbourne alumni
Australian Knights Bachelor
BHP people
Companions of the Order of Australia
People educated at Scotch College, Melbourne
Royal Australian Navy personnel of World War II